Aethiophysa dualis is a moth in the family Crambidae first described by William Barnes and James Halliday McDunnough in 1914. It is found in North America, where it has been recorded from Texas.

References

Moths described in 1914
Glaphyriinae
Moths of North America